John Augustus Hockaday House, also known as the Hockaday House, is a historic home located at Fulton, Callaway County, Missouri.  It was built between 1863 and 1868, and is a two-story, vernacular Greek Revival / Italianate style brick I-house.  It has a low hipped roof with denticulated cornice and features a two-story high portico with square piers and projecting bay.

The house was listed on the National Register of Historic Places in 1980.

References 

Houses on the National Register of Historic Places in Missouri
Greek Revival houses in Missouri
Italianate architecture in Missouri
Houses completed in 1868
Houses in Callaway County, Missouri
National Register of Historic Places in Callaway County, Missouri